"Love Parade" is the third Japanese single released by Korean boy group The Boss, originally intended as the last of their "Love Series". It was released on September 21, 2011 on their Japanese label Sony Music Entertainment. The single's B-side, "Girlfriend", was featured as the ending theme of the show Guru Guru Ninety Nine, which features a lot of different Japanese artists and has been running for many years. It was the show's fixed theme song from July 2011 until September 2011.

Single information
The single was released in three different versions, including a regular edition, limited edition A and limited edition B. Limited edition A includes a CD, a DVD and a booklet while limited edition B includes a CD and a DVD. First press regular edition releases are filled with trading cards, one out of six in each release.

Track list

CD

Limited edition A DVD

Limited edition B DVD

Charts

Release history

References

External links
 大国男児 | Sony Music 
 The Boss official website 

2011 singles
J-pop songs
2011 songs
Sony Music Entertainment Japan singles